Harbor of Missing Men is a 1950 American action film directed by R. G. Springsteen and written by John K. Butler. The film stars Richard Denning, Barbra Fuller, Steven Geray, Aline Towne, Percy Helton and George Zucco. The film was released on March 26, 1950 by Republic Pictures.

Plot

Cast    
Richard Denning as Jim 'Brooklyn' Gannon
Barbra Fuller as Mae Leggett / Miss Higgins
Steven Geray as Captain Corcoris
Aline Towne as Angelike Corcoris
Percy Helton as 'Rummy' Davis
George Zucco as H.G. Danziger
Paul Marion as Philip Corcoris
Ray Teal as Frank Leggett
Robert Osterloh as Johnny
Fernanda Eliscu as Mama Corcoris
Gregory Gaye as Captain Koretsky 
Jimmy Kelly as Carl Corcoris 
Barbara Stanley as Leodora
Neyle Morrow as Christopher Corcoris
Charles La Torre as John

References

External links 
 

1950 films
American action films
1950s action films
Republic Pictures films
Films directed by R. G. Springsteen
American black-and-white films
1950s English-language films
1950s American films